Tirta Gangga is a former royal palace in eastern Bali, Indonesia, about 5 kilometres from Karangasem, near Abang. Named after the sacred river Ganges in Hinduism, it is noted for the Karangasem royal water palace, bathing pools and its Patirthan temple. The one hectare complex was built in 1946 by the late King of Karangsem but was destroyed almost entirely by the eruption of nearby Mount Agung in 1963.

Tirta Gangga is based on the beliefs in Balinese Hinduism, where river Ganges and its waters are considered sacred. Its waters are cherished for irrigation and agricultural abundance, recreation and economic activity. The Patirthan temple illustrates the historic significance of Tirta Gangga in the Balinese tradition as a pilgrimage and holy water site.

Gallery

References
  Some of the content in this article was copied from Tirta Gangga at Wikitravel, which is licensed under the Creative Commons Attribution-Share Alike 3.0 (Unported) (CC-BY-SA 3.0) license.

External links

Official website

Palaces in Bali
Tourist attractions in Bali
Tourism in Bali